Dar Al-Handasah Consultants (Shair and Partners) is a privately-owned international consulting company active in engineering, architecture, planning, environmental consulting, project and construction management, facilities management, and economics, founded in 1956. Its principal design offices and technical support facilities are located in Beirut, Lebanon; Cairo, Egypt; London, United Kingdom; Warsaw, Poland; Pune, India; and Amman, Jordan, with 46 local branch offices located in the Middle East, Africa, and Asia.

Over the years, Dar has provided consultancy services to more than 950 clients in 60 countries and has handled over 4,000 projects involving a collective investment of over US$300 billion (construction costs for executed projects, excluding planning projects). With a permanent staff of 9,250 (including 6,300 professionally qualified engineers; architects; town planners; environmentalists; economists; finance, marketing and management specialists; quantity surveyors; and others) and over 4,000 successfully completed projects, Dar Al-Handasah does work in a wide range of engineering fields.

History 
Dar Al-Handasah was established in November 1956, and given the Arabic name دار الهندسة Dar Al-Handasah meaning "the house of engineering". It was founded by Kamal Shair (1930-2008) and three fellow professors in Engineering from the American University of Beirut (AUB) Engineering School. Later it was named Dar Al-Handasah Shair and Partners.

In 1986, the company acquired the United States-based design firm of Perkins and Will.

The firm won the IStructE Award for Transportation Structures and the Supreme Award in 2006 for designing the Prai River Bridge in Penang, Malaysia.

Subsidiaries and affiliations 

 T.Y. Lin International
 Introba Inc. (Merger of Integral Group and Ross & Baruzzini, Inc.)
 Landrum & Brown
 Maffeis Engineering S.p.A.
 GPO Group
 Perkins and Will
 Currie & Brown
 Penspen Group
 R&H Railway Consultants Group
 D2 Consult International GmbH

Selected projects 

 Prai River Bridge  – Penang, Malaysia
 Haramain high-speed railway  – Saudi Arabia
 Jamaraat Bridge  – Saudi Arabia
 Abraj Al Bait  – Mecca, Saudi Arabia
 Al Bayt Stadium  – Al Khor, Qatar
 Lusail Sports Arena  – Lusail, Qatar
 Iconic Tower  – New Administrative Capital, Egypt

References

External links 

 

Privately held companies of Lebanon
Architecture in Lebanon
International engineering consulting firms
1956 establishments in Lebanon
Consulting firms established in 1956
Design companies established in 1956